Canada Live was a weekend show which aired on CBC Radio in 1992 and 1993; initially hosted by Jack Farr as a replacement for The Radio Show, the program was a live call-in show whose concept was for Farr to talk to ordinary Canadians about everyday topics. 

Farr lasted just a few weeks as host of the program before announcing his departure, calling it "not a good fit", and was succeeded by Kris Purdy. 

The program was cancelled in 1993, and was replaced by Brand X.

References

CBC Radio One programs
Canadian talk radio programs
1992 radio programme debuts
1993 radio programme endings